was a stadium in Naniwa-ku, Osaka, Japan. It opened in 1950, with a capacity of 32,000 people. It was built over the site of a red-brick tobacco plant which was destroyed during the bombing of Osaka during World War II. The stadium was torn down in 1998 and was replaced by the office and shopping complex of Namba Parks in several stages, with final construction ending in April 2007.

The stadium was primarily used for baseball and was home of the Nankai Hawks until they moved to the Heiwadai Stadium in Fukuoka (subsequently becoming the Fukuoka Daiei Hawks, and are now the Fukuoka Softbank Hawks) in 1988.

Madonna kicked off her Who's That Girl World Tour at the stadium with two sold-out concerts on June 14 and 15, 1987. They were her first concerts in Japan.

Michael Jackson concluded the first leg of his Bad World Tour at the stadium, with three consecutive sold-out shows on October 10–12, 1987.

Gallery

References

See also
Namba Parks

Defunct baseball venues in Japan
Sports venues in Osaka
Nankai Hawks
Osaka Kintetsu Buffaloes
Yokohama BayStars
Demolished buildings and structures in Japan
Sports venues completed in 1950
Sports venues demolished in 2000
1950 establishments in Japan
2000 disestablishments in Japan